Kurt Leucht (31 March 1903 – 2 November 1974) was a Greco-Roman wrestler from Germany who won an Olympic title in 1928 and a silver medal at the 1931 European Championships.

References

External links
 

1903 births
1974 deaths
Olympic wrestlers of Germany
Wrestlers at the 1928 Summer Olympics
German male sport wrestlers
Olympic gold medalists for Germany
Olympic medalists in wrestling
Medalists at the 1928 Summer Olympics
Sportspeople from Nuremberg
20th-century German people